Hans-Joachim Nastold (13 July 1929 – 26 January 2004) was a German mathematician, who made notable contributions to algebra and number theory.

Born in Stuttgart, Nastold earned his Abitur in Göppingen. He attended the University of Heidelberg, earning his doctorate in 1957, under supervision of Friedrich Karl Schmidt.

References

External links

1929 births
2004 deaths
20th-century German mathematicians
21st-century German mathematicians
Heidelberg University alumni
Academic staff of the University of Münster